This article lists the Northern Ireland Conservatives election results in UK parliamentary elections.

Summary of general election performance

1987-1992 by-elections

1992 general election

By-elections, 1992-1997

1997 general election

2001 general election

2005 general election

2010 general election

Candidates stood as part of an electoral alliance with the Ulster Unionist Party with the ballot paper description Ulster Conservatives and Unionists - New Force.

2015 general election

2017 general election

2019 general election

References

Election results by party in the United Kingdom
Organisation of the Conservative Party (UK)